Brandie O’Connor (born 24 December 1973)  is a vision impaired Australian paracyclist and has won medals at the World Championships and Commonwealth Games..

Personal

O'Connor was born on 24 December 1973 in Brisbane, Queensland. She was born with rod monochromatism which affects her ability to see. O’Connor describes her condition, "what I see at 6 meters, ‘normal’ eyes see at 60 meters." She has a Bachelor of Commerce and works as a policy officer.

Career
In 2006, O’Connor started training and identified a pilot (person who is fully sighted and steers the bike) in Kerry Knowler. Breaking her clavicle and two ribs in a cycling accident this put O’Connor out of action until late 2007. O’Connor tried adaptive rowing and tried for the Beijing Paralympics but missed out. She made her international cycling debut at the  2010 UCI Paracycling Road World Championships in Canada. In 2012, she competed at the UCI Para-cycling Track World Championships in Los Angeles, United States and finished fourth in the Women's Individual Time Trial and fifth in the 3 km Pursuit. With pilot Breanna Hargrave, she won silver medals in the Women's Tandem Sprint and Tandem 1 km Time Trial at the 2014 UCI Para-Cycling Track World Championships. O'Connor and Hargrave won bronze medals in the Women's Tandem Sprint B and Women's Tandem 1 km Time Trial B at the  2014 Commonwealth Games in Glasgow, Scotland. At the 2015, UCI Para-cycling Track World Championships in Apledoorn, Netherlands, O'Connor and Hargrave won a silver medal in the Women’s Tandem Sprint and fifth in the Women 1 km Time Trial.

References

External links
Cycling Australia profile
Australian Paralympic Committee profile

1973 births
Living people
Paralympic cyclists of Australia
Paralympic cyclists with a vision impairment
Commonwealth Games medallists in cycling
Commonwealth Games bronze medallists for Australia
ACT Academy of Sport alumni
Australian female cyclists
Cyclists at the 2014 Commonwealth Games
Australian blind people
Medallists at the 2014 Commonwealth Games